Mayan Renaissance is a 2012 American documentary film by director Dawn Engle about the Maya peoples of Guatemala and Central America. It describes the ancient Maya civilization, the conquest by Spain during the 1520s, hundreds of years of oppression, and the modern struggle by Mayans for self-determination and a Mayan renaissance.

Its première screening at the United Nations Headquarters was on 16 May 2012 and its broadcast première on Colorado Public Television was on 6 June 2012.

The film contains interviews of 1992 Nobel Peace Prize winner, Rigoberta Menchú, a Mayan indigenous rights activist and politician, and other Guatemalan and foreign contributors. It was awarded the Best Colorado Filmmaker Documentary Award at The Film Festival of Colorado in July 2012. The documentary is the first of a planned ten-part Nobel Legacy Film Series.

Cast 

 Rigoberta Menchú
 Javier Payeras
 Adolfo Pérez Esquivel
 Rosalina Tuyuc
 Jody Williams
 Elisa Facio
 María Faviana Cochoy Alva
 Gerardo Gutiérrez
 Luz Méndez
 Claudia Samayoa
 Pedro Celestino Yac Noj

Additional cast 

 José Basillas
 Benjamin Borjes
 Anibal Garcia
 Sandra Monterroso
 José Antonio Otaolaurruchi
 Fernando Rodas
 David Rutherford (voice)

References

External links
 

2012 films
2012 documentary films
American documentary films
American independent films
Documentary films about historical events
Documentary films about indigenous rights
Documentary films about politics
Documentary films about race and ethnicity
Films set in Guatemala
2010s English-language films
2010s American films